An honor killing (American English), honour killing (Commonwealth English), or shame killing is the murder of an individual, either an outsider or a member of a family, by someone seeking to protect what they see as the dignity and honor of themselves or their family. Honor killings are often connected to religion, caste and other forms of hierarchical social stratification, or to sexuality. Most often, it involves the murder of a woman or girl by male family members, due to the perpetrators' belief that the victim has brought dishonor or shame upon the family name, reputation or prestige. Honor killings are believed to have originated from tribal customs. They are prevalent in various parts of the world, as well as in immigrant communities in countries which do not otherwise have societal norms that encourage honor killings. Honor killings are often associated with rural and tribal areas, but they occur in urban areas too.

Although condemned by international conventions and human rights organizations, honor killings are often justified and encouraged by various communities. In cases where the victim is an outsider, not murdering this individual would, in some regions, cause family members to be accused of cowardice, a moral defect, and subsequently be morally stigmatized in their community. In cases when the victim is a family member, the murdering evolves from the perpetrators' perception that the victim has brought shame or dishonor upon the entire family, which could lead to social ostracization, by violating the moral norms of a community. Typical reasons include being in a relationship or having associations with social groups outside the family that may lead to social exclusion of a family (stigma-by-association). Examples are having premarital, extramarital or postmarital sex (in case of divorce or widowship), refusing to enter into an arranged marriage, seeking a divorce or separation,  engaging in interfaith relations or relations with persons from a different caste,  being the victim of a sexual crime, dressing in clothing, jewelry and accessories that are associated with sexual deviance, engaging in a relationship in spite of moral marriage impediments or bans, and homosexuality.

Though both men and women commit and are victims of honor killings, in many communities conformity to moral standards implies different behavior for men and women, including stricter standards for chastity for women. In many families, the honor motive is used by men as a pretext to restrict the rights of women. Honor killings are performed in communities with the intent to punish violations of social, sexual, religious or family norms or hierarchies. In many cases, the honor killings are committed by family members against a female relative considered to have disgraced her family.

Honor killings are primarily associated with Greater Middle East, but are also rooted in other cultures, including India and the Philippines.

Definitions
Human Rights Watch defines "honor killings" as follows:

Honor crimes are acts of violence, usually murder, committed by male family members against female family members who are perceived to have brought dishonor upon the family. A woman can be targeted by her family for a variety of reasons including, refusing to enter into an arranged marriage, being the victim of a sexual assault, seeking a divorce—even from an abusive husband—or committing adultery. The mere perception that a woman has acted in a manner to bring "dishonor" to the family is sufficient to trigger an attack.

Men can also be the victims of honor killings, either committed by members of the family of a woman with whom they are perceived to have an inappropriate relationship; or by the members of their own families, the latter often connected to homosexuality.

General characteristics
Many honor killings are planned by multiple members of a family, sometimes through a formal "family council". The threat of murder is used as a means to control behavior, especially concerning sexuality and marriage, which may be seen as a duty for some or all family members to uphold. Family members may feel compelled to act to preserve the reputation of the family in the community and avoid stigma or shunning, particularly in tight-knit communities. Perpetrators often do not face negative stigma within their communities, because their behavior is seen as justified.

Extent
Reliable figures of honor killings are hard to obtain, in large part because "honor" is either improperly defined or is defined in ways other than in Article 12 of the UDHR (block-quoted above) without a clear follow-up explanation. As a result, criteria are hardly ever given for objectively determining whether a given case is an instance of honor killing. Because of the lack of both a clear definition of "honor" and coherent criteria, it is often presupposed that more women than men are victims of honor killings, and victim counts often contain women exclusively.

Honor killings occur in many parts of the world, but are most widely reported in the Middle East, South Asia and North Africa.

 Historically, honor killings were also common in Southern Europe, “there have been acts of ‘honour’ killings within living memory within Mediterranean countries such as Italy and Greece."

Methods
Methods of murdering include stoning, stabbing, beating, burning, beheading, hanging, throat slashing, lethal acid attacks, shooting, and strangulation. Sometimes, communities perform murders in public to warn others in the community of the possible consequences of engaging in what is seen as illicit behavior.

Use of minors as perpetrators
Often, minor girls and boys are selected by the family to act as the murderers, so that the murderer may benefit from the most favorable legal outcome. Boys and sometimes women in the family are often asked to closely control and monitor the behavior of their sisters or other females in the family, to ensure that the females do not do anything to tarnish the 'honor' and 'reputation' of the family. The boys are often asked to carry out the murder, and if they refuse, they may face serious repercussions from the family and community for failing to perform their "duty".

Culture

The cultural features which lead to honor killings are complex. Honor killings involve violence and fear as a tool for maintaining control. Honor killings are argued to have their origins among nomadic peoples and herdsmen: such populations carry all their valuables with them and risk having them stolen, and they do not have proper recourse to law. As a result, inspiring fear, using aggression, and cultivating a reputation for violent revenge to protect property is preferable to other behaviors. In societies where there is a weak rule of law, people must build fierce reputations.

In many cultures where honor is of a central value, men are sources, or active generators/agents, of that honor, while the only effect that women can have on honor is to destroy it. Once the family's or clan's honor is considered to have been destroyed by a woman, there is a need for immediate revenge to restore it, for the family to avoid losing face in the community. As Amnesty International statement notes:

The relation between social views on female sexuality and honor killings are complex. The way through which women in honor-based societies are considered to bring dishonor to men is often through their sexual behavior. Indeed, violence related to female sexual expression has been documented since Ancient Rome, when the pater familias had the right to kill an unmarried sexually active daughter or an adulterous wife. In medieval Europe, early Jewish law mandated stoning for an adulterous wife and her partner.

Carolyn Fluehr-Lobban, an anthropology professor at Rhode Island College, writes that an act, or even alleged act, of any female sexual misconduct, upsets the moral order of the culture, and bloodshed is the only way to remove any shame brought by the actions and restore social equilibrium. However, the relation between honor and female sexuality is a complicated one, and some authors argue that it is not women's sexuality per se that is the 'problem', but rather women's self-determination in regard to it, as well as fertility. Sharif Kanaana, professor of anthropology at Birzeit University, says that honor killing is:

In some cultures, honor killings are considered less serious than other murders simply because they arise from long-standing cultural traditions and are thus deemed appropriate or justifiable. Additionally, according to a poll done by the BBC's Asian network, 1 in 10 of the 500 young South Asians surveyed said they would condone any murder of someone who threatened their family's honor.

Nighat Taufeeq of the women's resource center Shirkatgah in Lahore, Pakistan says: "It is an unholy alliance that works against women: the killers take pride in what they have done, the tribal leaders condone the act and protect the killers and the police connive the cover-up." The lawyer and human rights activist Hina Jilani says, "The right to life of women in Pakistan is conditional on their obeying social norms and traditions."

A July 2008 Turkish study by a team from Dicle University on honor killings in the Southeastern Anatolia Region, the predominantly Kurdish area of Turkey, has so far shown that little if any social stigma is attached to honor killing. It also comments that the practice is not related to a feudal societal structure, "there are also perpetrators who are well-educated university graduates. Of all those surveyed, 60 percent are either high school or university graduates or at the very least, literate."

In contemporary times, the changing cultural and economic status of women has also been used to explain the occurrences of honor killings. Women in largely patriarchal cultures who have gained economic independence from their families go against their male-dominated culture. Some researchers argue that the shift towards greater responsibility for women and less for their fathers may cause their male family members to act in oppressive and sometimes violent manners to regain authority.

Fareena Alam, editor of a Muslim magazine, writes that honor killings which arise in Western cultures such as Britain are a tactic for immigrant families to cope with the alienating consequences of urbanization. Alam argues that immigrants remain close to the home culture and their relatives because it provides a safety net. She writes that 

Alam argues that it is thus the attempt to regain control and the feelings of alienation that ultimately leads to an honor killing.

Specific triggers of honor killings

Refusal of an arranged or forced marriage

Refusal of an arranged marriage or forced marriage is often a cause of an honor killing. The family that has prearranged the marriage risks disgrace if the marriage does not proceed, and the betrothed is indulged in a relationship with another individual without prior knowledge of the family members.

Seeking a divorce
A woman attempting to obtain a divorce or separation without the consent of the husband/extended family can also be a trigger for honor killings. In cultures where marriages are arranged and goods are often exchanged between families, a woman's desire to seek a divorce is often viewed as an insult to the men who negotiated the deal. By making their marital problems known outside the family, the women are seen as exposing the family to public dishonor.

Allegations and rumors about a family member
In certain cultures, an allegation against a woman can be enough to tarnish her family's reputation, and to trigger an honor killing: the family's fear of being ostracized by the community is enormous.

Victims of rape

In many cultures, victims of rape face severe violence, including honor killings, from their families and relatives. In many parts of the world, women who have been raped are considered to have brought 'dishonor' or 'disgrace' to their families. This is especially the case if the victim becomes pregnant.

Central to the code of honor, in many societies, is a woman's virginity, which must be preserved until marriage. Suzanne Ruggi writes, "A woman's virginity is the property of the men around her, first her father, later a gift for her husband; a virtual dowry as she graduates to marriage."

Homosexuality

There is evidence that homosexuality can also be perceived as grounds for honor killing by relatives. It is not only same-sex sexual acts that trigger violence—behaviors that are regarded as inappropriate gender expression (e.g. male acting or dressing in a "feminine way") can also raise suspicion and lead to honor violence.

In one case, a gay Jordanian man was shot and wounded by his brother. In another case, in 2008, a homosexual Turkish-Kurdish student, Ahmet Yildiz, was shot outside a cafe and later died in the hospital. Sociologists have called this Turkey's first publicized gay honor killing. In 2012, a 17-year-old gay youth was murdered by his father in Turkey in the southeastern province of Diyarbakır.

The United Nations High Commissioner for Refugees states that "claims made by LGBT persons often reveal exposure to physical and sexual violence, extended periods of detention, medical abuse, the threat of execution and honor killing."

A 2019 study found that antigay "honor" abuse found more support in four surveyed Asian countries (India, Iran, Malaysia, and Pakistan) and among Asian British people than in a White British sample. The study also found that women and younger people were less likely to support such "honor" abuse. Muslims and Hindus were substantially more likely to approve of "honor" abuse than Christians or Buddhists, who scored lowest of the examined religious groups.

Forbidden male partners
In many honor-based cultures, a woman maintains her honor through her modesty. If a man disrupts a woman's modesty, through dating her, having sex with her (especially if her virginity was lost),  the man has dishonored the woman, even if the relationship is consensual. Thus to restore the woman's lost honor, the male members of her family will often beat and murder the offender. Sometimes, violence extends to the offender's family members, since honor feud attacks are seen as family conflicts.

Outside the caste relations

Some cultures have very strong caste social systems, based on social stratification characterized by endogamy, hereditary transmission of a style of life which often includes an occupation, ritual status in a hierarchy, customary social interaction, and exclusion based on cultural notions of purity and pollution. The caste system in India is such an example. In such cultures, it is often expected that one marries and forms closed associations only within one's caste, and avoids lower castes. When these rules are violated, this can result in violence, including honor killings.

Socializing outside the home

In some cultures, women are expected to have a primarily domestic role. Such ideas are often based on practices like purdah. Purdah is a religious and social practice of female seclusion prevalent among some Muslim and Hindu communities; it often requires having women stay indoors, the avoiding of socialization between men and women, and full body covering of women, including burqa. When these rules are violated, including by dressing in a way deemed inappropriate or displaying behavior seen as disobedient, the family may respond with violence up to honor killings.

Renouncing or changing religion and interfaith relations
 
Violating religious dogma, such as changing or renouncing religion can trigger honor killings. Such ideas are supported by laws in some countries: blasphemy is punishable by death in Afghanistan, Iran, Nigeria, Pakistan, Saudi Arabia and Somalia; and punishable by prison in many other countries. Apostasy is also illegal in 25 countries, in some punishable with the death penalty. 

Refusing to wear clothes associated with a culture or a religion, such as burqa, or otherwise choosing to wear what is seen as 'foreign' or 'western' types of clothing can trigger honor killings.

Marriage or relations between people of different religions can result in violence and killings.

Causes
There are multiple causes for which honor killings occur, and numerous factors interact with each other.

Views on women
Honor killings are often a result of strongly misogynistic views towards women and the position of women in society. In these traditionally male-dominated societies, women are dependent first on their father and then on their husbands, whom they are expected to obey. Women are viewed as property and not as individuals with their own agency. As such, they must submit to male authority figures in the family—failure to do so can result in extreme violence as punishment. Violence is seen as a way of ensuring compliance and preventing rebellion. According to Shahid Khan, a professor at the Aga Khan University in Pakistan: "Women are considered the property of the males in their family irrespective of their class, ethnic, or religious group. The owner of the property has the right to decide its fate. The concept of ownership has turned women into a commodity which can be exchanged, bought and sold". In such cultures, women are not allowed to take control over their bodies and sexuality: these are the property of the males of the family, the father (and other male relatives) who must ensure virginity until marriage; and then the husband to whom his wife's sexuality is subordinated—a woman must not undermine the ownership rights of her guardian by engaging in premarital sex or adultery.

Cultures of honor and shame
The concept of family honor is extremely important in many communities worldwide. The UN estimates that 5,000 women and girls are murdered each year in honor killings, which are widely reported in the Middle East and South Asia, but they occur in countries as varied as Brazil, Canada, Iran, Israel, Italy, Jordan, Egypt, Sweden, Syria, Uganda, United Kingdom, the United States, and other countries. In honor cultures, managing reputation is an important social ethic. Men are expected to act tough and be intolerant of disrespect and women are expected to be loyal to the family and be chaste. An insult to your personal or family honor must be met with a response, or the stain of dishonor can affect many others in the family and the wider community. Such acts often include female behaviors that are related to sex outside marriage or way of dressing, but may also include male homosexuality (like the emo killings in Iraq). The family may lose respect in the community and may be shunned by relatives. The only way they perceive that shame can be erased is through an honor killing. The cultures in which honor killings take place are usually considered "collectivist cultures", where the family is more important than the individual, and individual autonomy is seen as a threat to the family and its honor.

Though it may seem in a modern context that honor killings are tied to certain religious traditions, the data does not support this claim. Research in Jordan found that teenagers who strongly endorsed honor killings in fact did not come from more religious households than teens who rejected it. The ideology of honor is a cultural phenomenon that does not appear to be related to religion, be it Middle Eastern or Western countries, and honor killings likely have a long history in human societies which predate many modern religions. In the US, a rural trend known as the "small-town effect" exhibit elevated incidents of argument-related homicides among white males, particularly in honor-oriented states in the South and the West, where everyone "knows your name and knows your shame." This is similarly observed in rural areas in other parts of the world.

Honor cultures pervade in places of economic vulnerability and with the absence of the rule of law, where law enforcement cannot be counted on to protect them. People then resort to their reputations to protect them from social exploitation and a man must "stand up for himself" and not rely on others to do so. To lose your honor is to lose this protective barrier. Possessing honor in such a society can grant social status and economic and social opportunities. When honor is ruined, a person or family in an honor culture can be socially ostracized, face restricted economic opportunities, and have a difficult time finding a mate.

Laws and European colonialism

Legal frameworks can encourage honor killings. Such laws include on one side leniency towards such murdering, and on the other side criminalization of various behaviors, such as extramarital sex, "indecent" dressing in public places, or homosexual sexual acts, with these laws acting as a way of reassuring perpetrators of honor killings that people engaging in these behaviors deserve punishment.

In the Roman Empire the Roman law Lex Julia de adulteriis coercendis implemented by Augustus Caesar permitted the murder of daughters and their lovers who committed adultery at the hands of their fathers and also permitted the murder of the adulterous wife's lover at the hand of her husband.

Provocation in English law and related laws on adultery in English law, as well as Article 324 of the French penal code of 1810 were legal concepts which allowed for reduced punishment for the murder committed by a husband against his wife and her lover if the husband had caught them in the act of adultery. On 7 November 1975, Law no. 617/75 Article 17 repealed the 1810 French Penal Code Article 324. The 1810 penal code Article 324 passed by Napoleon was copied by Middle Eastern Arab countries. It inspired Jordan's Article 340 which permitted the murder of a wife and her lover if caught in the act at the hands of her husband (today the article provides for mitigating circumstances). France's 1810 Penal Code Article 324 also inspired the 1858 Ottoman Penal Code's Article 188, both the French Article 324 and Ottoman article 188 were drawn on to create Jordan's Article 340 which was retained even after a 1944 revision of Jordan's laws which did not touch public conduct and family law; article 340 still applies to this day in a modified form. France's Mandate over Lebanon resulted in its penal code being imposed there in 1943–1944, with the French-inspired Lebanese law for adultery allowing the mere accusation of adultery against women resulting in a maximum punishment of two years in prison while men have to be caught in the act and not merely accused, and are punished with only one year in prison.

France's Article 324 inspired laws in other Arab countries such as:

 Algeria's 1991 Penal Code Article 279
 Egypt's 1937 Penal Code no. 58 Article 237
Iraq's 1966 Penal Code Article 409
 Jordan's 1960 Penal Code no. 16 Article 340
 Kuwait's Penal Code Article 153
 Lebanon's Penal Code Articles 193, 252, 253 and 562
 These were amended in 1983, 1994, 1995, 1996, and 1999 and were eventually repealed by the Lebanese Parliament on 4 August 2011
 Libya's Penal Code Article 375
 Morocco's 1963 amended Penal Code Article 418
 Oman's Penal Code Article 252
 Palestine, which had two codes: Jordan's 1960 Penal Code 1960 in the West Bank and British Mandate Criminal Code Article 18 in the Gaza Strip
 These were respectively repealed by Article 1 and Article 2 and both by Article 3 of the 2011 Law no. 71 which was signed on 5 May 2011 by president Mahmoud Abbas into the 10 October 2011 Official Gazette no. 91 applying in the Criminal Code of Palestine's Northern Governorates and Southern Governorates
 Syria's 1953 amended 1949 Penal Code Article 548
 Tunisia's 1991 Penal Code Article 207 (which was repealed)
 United Arab Emirate's law no.3/1978 Article 334
 Yemen's law no. 12/1994 Article 232

In Pakistan, the law was based upon on the 1860 Indian Penal Code (IPC) implemented by the colonial authorities in British India, which allowed for mitigation of punishment for charges of assault or criminal force in the case of a "grave and sudden provocation". This clause was used to justify the legal status of honor killing in Pakistan, although the IPC makes no mention of it. In 1990, the Pakistani government reformed this law to bring it in terms with the Shari'a, and the Pakistani Federal Shariat Court declared that "according to the teachings of Islam, provocation, no matter how grave and sudden it is, does not lessen the intensity of crime of murder". However, Pakistani judges still sometimes hand down lenient sentences for honor killings, justified by still citing the IPC's mention of a "grave and sudden provocation."

Forced suicide as a substitute

A forced suicide may be a substitute for an honor killing. In this case, the family members do not directly murder the victim themselves, but force him or her to commit suicide, in order to avoid punishment. Such suicides are reported to be common in southeastern Turkey. It was reported that in 2001, 565 women lost their lives in honor-related crimes in Ilam, Iran, of which 375 were reportedly staged as self-immolation. In 2008, self-immolation "occurred in all the areas of Kurdish settlement (in Iran), where it was more common than in other parts of Iran". It is claimed that in Iraqi Kurdistan many deaths are reported as "female suicides" in order to conceal honor-related crimes.

Restoring honor through a forced marriage

In the case of an unmarried woman or girl associating herself with a man, losing virginity, or being raped, the family may attempt to restore its 'honor' with a 'shotgun wedding'. The groom will usually be the man who has 'dishonored' the woman or girl, but if this is not possible the family may try to arrange a marriage with another man, often a man who is part of the extended family of the one who has committed the acts with the woman or girl. This being an alternative to an honor killing, the woman or girl has no choice but to accept the marriage. The family of the man is expected to cooperate and provide a groom for the woman.

Religion
Widney Brown, the advocacy director of Human Rights Watch, said that the practice "goes across cultures and religions".

Resolution 1327 (2003) of the Council of Europe states that:

Many Muslim commentators and organizations condemn honor killings as an un-Islamic cultural practice. There is no mention of honor killing (extrajudicial killing by a woman's family) in the Qur'an, and the practice violates Islamic law. Tahira Shaid Khan, a professor of women's issues at Aga Khan University, blames such murdering on attitudes (across different classes, ethnic, and religious groups) that view women as property with no rights of their own as the motivation for honor killings. Ali Gomaa, Egypt's former Grand Mufti, has also spoken out forcefully against honor killings.

As a more generic statement reflecting the wider Islamic scholarly trend, Jonathan A. C. Brown says that "questions about honor killings have regularly found their way into the inboxes of muftis like Yusuf Qaradawi or the late scholar Muhammad Husayn Fadlallah. Their responses reflect a rare consensus. No Muslim scholar of any note, either medieval or modern, has sanctioned a man killing his wife or sister for tarnishing her or the family's honor. If a woman or man found together were to deserve the death penalty for fornication, this would have to be established by the evidence required by the Koran: either a confession or the testimony of four male witnesses, all upstanding in the eyes of the court, who actually saw penetration occur."

Further, while honor killings are common in Muslim countries like Pakistan and the Arab nation, it is a practically unknown practice in other Muslim countries, such as Indonesia, Bangladesh, and Senegal. This fact supports the idea that honor killings are to do with culture rather than religion.

The late Yemeni Muslim scholar Muḥammad Shawkānī wrote that one reason the Shari'a stipulates execution as a potential punishment for men who murder women is to counter honor killings for alleged slights of honor. He wrote, "There is no doubt that laxity on this matter is one of the greatest means leading to women's lives being destroyed, especially in the Bedouin regions, which are characterized by harsh-hardheartedness and a strong sense of honor and shame stemming from Pre-Islamic times".

In history
Matthew A. Goldstein, J.D. (Arizona), has noted that honor killings were encouraged in ancient Rome, where male family members who did not take action against the female adulterers in their families were "actively persecuted".

The origin of honor killings and the control of women is evidenced throughout history in the cultures and traditions of many regions. The Roman law of pater familias gave complete control to the men of the family over both their children and wives. Under these laws, the lives of children and wives were at the discretion of the men in their families. Ancient Roman Law also justified honor killings by stating that women who were found guilty of adultery could be killed by their husbands. During the Qing dynasty in China, fathers and husbands had the right to kill daughters who were deemed to have dishonored the family.

Among the Indigenous Aztecs and Incas, adultery was punishable by death. During John Calvin's rule of Geneva, women found guilty of adultery were punished by being drowned in the Rhône river.

Honor killings have a long tradition in Mediterranean Europe. According to the Honour Related Violence – European Resource Book and Good Practice (page 234): "Honor in the Mediterranean world is a code of conduct, a way of life and an ideal of the social order, which defines the lives, the customs and the values of many of the peoples in the Mediterranean moral".

By region

According to the UN in 2002:

In addition, the United Nations Commission on Human Rights gathered reports from several countries and considering only the countries that submitted reports it was shown that honor killings have occurred in Bangladesh, Great Britain, Brazil, Ecuador, Egypt, India, Israel, Italy, Jordan, Pakistan, Morocco, Sweden, Turkey, and Uganda.

According to Widney Brown, advocacy director for Human Rights Watch, the practice of honor killing "goes across cultures and religions."

International response

Honor killings are condemned as a serious human rights violation and are addressed by several international instruments.

Honor killings are opposed by United Nations General Assembly Resolution 55/66 (adopted in 2000) and subsequent resolutions, which have generated various reports.

The Council of Europe Convention on preventing and combating violence against women and domestic violence addresses this issue. Article 42 reads:

The World Health Organization (WHO) addressed the issue of honor killings and stated: "Murders of women to 'save the family honor' are among the most tragic consequences and explicit illustrations of embedded, culturally accepted discrimination against women and girls." According to the UNODC: "Honour crimes, including killing, are one of history's oldest forms of gender-based violence. It assumes that a woman's behavior casts a reflection on the family and the community. ... In some communities, a father, brother, or cousin will publicly take pride in a murder committed to preserving the 'honor' of a family. In some such cases, local justice officials may side with the family and take no formal action to prevent similar deaths."

In national legal codes
Legislation on this issue varies, but today the vast majority of countries no longer allow a husband to legally murder a wife for adultery (although adultery itself continues to be punishable by death in some countries) or to commit other forms of honor killings. However, in many places, adultery and other "immoral" sexual behaviors by female family members can be considered mitigating circumstances in the case when they are murdered, leading to significantly shorter sentences.

Contemporary laws which allow for mitigating circumstances or acquittals for men who murder female family members due to sexual behaviors are, for the most part, inspired by the French Napoleonic Code (France's crime of passion law, which remained in force until 1975). The Middle East, including the Arab countries of North Africa, Iran and non-Arab minorities within Arabic countries, have high recorded level of honor crimes, and these regions are the most likely to have laws offering complete or partial defenses to honor killings. However, with the exception of Iran, laws which provide leniency for honor killings are not derived from Islamic law, but from the penal codes of the Napoleonic Empire.  French culture shows a higher level of toleration of such crimes among the public, compared to other Western countries; and indeed, recent surveys have shown the French public to be more accepting of these practices than the public in other countries. One 2008 Gallup survey compared the views of the French, German and British public and those of French, German and British Muslims on several social issues: 4% of the French public said "honor killings" were "morally acceptable" and 8% of the French public said "crimes of passion" were "morally acceptable"; honor killings were seen as acceptable by 1% of German public and also 1% of the British public; crimes of passion were seen as acceptable by 1% of German public and 2% of the British public. Among Muslims, 5% in Paris, 3% in Berlin, and 3% in London saw honor killings as acceptable, and 4% in Paris (less than the French public), 1% in Berlin, and 3% in London saw crimes of passion as acceptable.

According to the report of the United Nations Special Rapporteur submitted to the 58th session of the United Nations Commission on Human Rights in 2002 concerning cultural practices in the family that reflect violence against women (E/CN.4/2002/83):

As of 2022, most countries with complete or partial defenses for killings due to sexual behaviors or parental disobedience are MENA countries, but there are some notable exceptions, namely Philippines. The legal aspects of honor killings in different countries are discussed below:

Yemen: laws effectively exonerate fathers who murder their children; also the blood money paid for females that are murdered is less than that for males that are murdered.
 Iran: Article 630 exempts a husband from punishment if he murders his wife or her lover upon discovering them in the act of adultery; article 301 stipulates that a father and paternal grandfather are not to be retaliated against for murdering their child/grandchild. 
Jordan: In recent years, Jordan has amended its Code to modify its laws, which used to offer a complete defense for honor killings.
Syria: In 2009, Article 548 of the Syrian Law code was amended. Beforehand, the article waived any punishment for males who murdered a female family member for inappropriate sexual acts. Article 548 states that "He who catches his wife or one of his ascendants, descendants or sister committing adultery (flagrante delicto) or illegitimate sexual acts with another and he killed or injured one or both of them benefits from a reduced penalty, that should not be less than two years in prison in case of killing." Article 192 states that a judge may opt for reduced punishments (such as short-term imprisonment) if the murder was done with an honorable intent. In addition to this, Article 242 says that a judge may reduce a sentence for murders that were done in rage and caused by an illegal act committed by the victim.
In Brazil, an explicit defense to murder in case of adultery has never been part of the criminal code, but a defense of "honor" (not part of the criminal code) has been widely used by lawyers in such cases to obtain acquittals. Although this defense has been generally rejected in modern parts of the country (such as big cities) since the 1950s, it has been very successful in the interior of the country. In 1991 Brazil's Supreme Court explicitly rejected the "honor" defense as having no basis in Brazilian law.
Turkey: In Turkey, persons found guilty of this crime are sentenced to life in prison. There are well documented cases, where Turkish courts have sentenced whole families to life imprisonment for an honor killing. The most recent was on 13 January 2009, where a Turkish Court sentenced five members of the same Kurdish family to life imprisonment for the honor killing of Naile Erdas, 16, who got pregnant as a result of rape.
Pakistan: Honor killings are known as karo kari. The practice is supposed to be prosecuted as an ordinary killing, but in practice police and prosecutors often ignore it. Often, a man who has committed murder must simply claim it was for his honor and he will avoid punishment. Nilofar Bakhtiar, an advisor to Prime Minister Shaukat Aziz, stated that as many as 1,261 women were murdered in honor killings in 2003. The Hudood Ordinances, enacted in 1979 by President Muhammad Zia-ul-Haq, had the effect of reducing legal protections for women, especially regarding sex outside marriage. This law made it much riskier for women to come forward with accusations of rape. On 8 December 2004, under international and domestic pressure, Pakistan enacted a new law that made honor killings punishable by a prison term of seven years, or by the death penalty in the most extreme cases. In 2006, the Women's Protection Bill amended the Hudood Ordinances. In 2016, Pakistan repealed a loophole which allowed the perpetrators of honor killings to avoid punishment by seeking forgiveness for the crime from another family member, and thus be legally pardoned.
Egypt: Several studies on honor crimes by The Centre of Islamic and Middle Eastern Law, at the School of Oriental and African Studies in London, includes one which reports on Egypt's legal system, noting a gender bias in favor of men in general, and notably article 17 of the Penal Code: judicial discretion to allow reduced punishment in certain circumstance, often used in honor killings case.
Haiti: In 2005, the laws were changed, abolishing the right of a husband to be excused for murdering his wife due to adultery. Adultery was also decriminalized.
Uruguay: until December 2017, article 36 of the Penal Code provided for the exoneration for murder of a spouse due to "the passion provoked by adultery". The case of violence against women in Uruguay has been debated in the context that it is otherwise a liberal country; nevertheless, domestic violence is a very serious problem; according to a 2018 United Nations study, Uruguay has the second-highest rate of killings of women by current or former partners in Latin America, after the Dominican Republic. Despite having a reputation of being a progressive country, Uruguay has lagged behind with regard to its approach to domestic violence; for example, in Chile, considered one of the most socially conservative countries of the region, similar legislation permitting such honor killings was repealed in 1953. 
Philippines: murdering one's spouse upon being caught in the act of adultery or one's daughter upon being caught in the act of premarital  sex is punished by  destierro (Art. 247) (destierro is banishment from a geographical area for a period of time). Philippine maintains several other traditionalist laws: it is the only country in the world (except Vatican City) that bans divorce; it is one of 20 countries that still has a marry-your-rapist law (that is, a law that exonerates a rapist from punishment if he marries the victim after the attack); and Philippine is also one of the few non-Muslim majority countries to have a criminal law against adultery (Philippine's adultery law also differentiates by gender defining and punishing adultery more severely if committed by women – see articles 333 and 334)

Support and sanction
Actions of Pakistani police officers and judges (particularly at the lower level of the judiciary) have, in the past, seemed to support the act of honor killings in the name of family honor. Police enforcement, in situations of admitted murder, does not always take action against the perpetrator. Also, judges in Pakistan (particularly at the lower level of the judiciary), rather than ruling cases with gender equality in mind, also seem to reinforce inequality and in some cases sanction the murder of women considered dishonorable. Often, a suspected honor killing never even reaches court, but in cases where they do, the alleged killer is often not charged or is given a reduced sentence of three to four years in jail. In a case study of 150 honor killings, the proceeding judges rejected only eight claims that the women were murdered for the honor. The rest were sentenced lightly. In many cases in Pakistan, one of the reasons honor killing cases never make it to the courts, is because, according to some lawyers and women's right activists, Pakistani law enforcement do not get involved. Under the encouragement of the killer, police often declare the killing as a domestic case that warrants no involvement. In other cases, the women and victims are too afraid to speak up or press charges. Police officials, however, claim that these cases are never brought to them, or are not major enough to be pursued on a large scale. The general indifference to the issue of honor killing within Pakistan is due to a deep-rooted gender bias in law, the police force, and the judiciary. In its report, "Pakistan: Honor Killings of Girls and Women", published in September 1999, Amnesty International criticized governmental indifference and called for state responsibility in protecting human rights of female victims. To elaborate, Amnesty strongly requested the Government of Pakistan to take 1) legal, 2) preventive, and 3) protective measures. First of all, legal measures refer to a modification of the government's criminal laws to guarantee equal legal protection of females. On top of that, Amnesty insisted the government assure legal access for the victims of crime in the name of honor. When it comes to preventive measures, Amnesty underlined the critical need to promote public awareness through the means of media, education, and public announcements. Finally, protective measures include ensuring a safe environment for activists, lawyers, and women's groups to facilitate the eradication of honor killings. Also, Amnesty argued for the expansion of victim support services such as shelters.

Kremlin-appointed Chechen president Ramzan Kadyrov said that honor killings were perpetrated on those who deserved to die. He said that those who are killed have "loose morals" and are rightfully shot by relatives in honor killings. He did not vilify women alone but added that "If a woman runs around and if a man runs around with her, both of them are killed."

In 2007, a famous Norwegian Supreme Court advocate stated that he wanted the punishment for the killing reduced from 17 years in prison to 15 years in the case of honor killings practiced in Norway. He explained that the Norwegian public did not understand other cultures who practiced honor killings, or understand their thinking, and that Norwegian culture "is self-righteous".

In 2008, Israr Ullah Zehri, a Pakistani politician in Balochistan, defended the honor killings of five women belonging to the Umrani tribe by a relative of a local Umrani politician. Zehri defended the murdering in Parliament and asked his fellow legislators not to make a fuss about the incident. He said, "These are centuries-old traditions, and I will continue to defend them. Only those who indulge in immoral acts should be afraid."

Nilofar Bakhtiar, who was Minister for Tourism and Advisor to Pakistan Prime Minister on Women's Affairs, campaigned against honor killings in Pakistan while in office.

Victims
This is an incomplete list of notable victims of Honor killing. See also Category:Victims of honor killing

 Rania Alayed (UK)
 Noor Faleh Almaleki
 Shafilea Ahmed – Murdered by the family for rejecting a marriage partner.
 Du'a Khalil Aswad – Yazidi girl who was killed for supposedly converting to Islam to date a Muslim boy in Iraq
 Surjit Athwal (Murder planned in the UK and carried out in India)
 Gelareh Bagherzadeh (US) - For encouraging her friend Nesreen Irsan to leave Islam (US)
 Qandeel Baloch
 Coty Beavers - for marrying Nesreen Irsan (US)
 Anooshe Sediq Ghulam
 Tulay Goren (UK)
 Leila Hussein and her daughter Rand Abdel-Qader
 Palestina Isa
 Manoj and Babli
 Sandeela Kanwal
 Nitish Katara
 Ghazala Khan – Murdered by her brother for marrying against the will of the family.
 Katya Koren (Ukraine)
 Banaz Mahmod. Her story was chronicled in the 2012 documentary film Banaz: A Love Story.
 Rukhsana Naz (UK)
 Samaira Nazir
 Morsal Obeidi (Germany)
 Aqsa Parvez
 Uzma Rahan and her children: sons, Adam and Abbas, and daughter, Henna (UK)
 Caneze Riaz and her four daughters, Sayrah, Sophia, Alicia and Hannah (UK)
 Fadime Sahindal
 Tursunoy Saidazimova
 Amina and Sarah Said
 Hina Salem (Italy)
 Samia Sarwar
 Zainab, Sahar, and Geeti Shafia, and Rona Amir Mohammad
 Sadia Sheikh
 Jaswinder Kaur Sidhu
 Hatun Sürücü
 Swera (Switzerland)
 Heshu Yones (UK)
 Nurkhon Yuldasheva
 Aasiya Zubair
 Rona Muhammad Omar and three of her husband's children (Canada)

Comparison to other forms of murdering
Honor killings are, along with dowry killings (most of which are committed in South Asia), gang-related murderings of women as revenge (killings of female members of rival gang members' families—most of which are committed in Latin America) and witchcraft accusation killings (most of which are committed in Africa and Oceania) are some of the most recognized forms of femicide.

Human rights advocates have compared "honor killings" to "crimes of passion" in Latin America (which are sometimes treated extremely leniently) and the murdering of women for lack of dowry in India.

Some commentators have stressed the point that the focus on honor killings should not lead people to ignore other forms of gender-based murdering of women, in particular, those which occur in Latin America (femicides such as "crimes of passion" and gang-related killings); the murder rate of women in this region is extremely high, with El Salvador being reported as the country with the highest rate of murders of women in the world. In 2002, Widney Brown, advocacy director for Human Rights Watch, stated that "crimes of passion have a similar dynamic in that the women are murdered by male family members and the crimes are perceived as excusable or understandable".

See also

 Blood atonement – a controversial practice in the history of Mormonism which is similar to the practice of honor killing . Under blood atonement,  the atonement of Jesus does not redeem an eternal sin.
 Child abuse
 Child murder
 Chronicle of a Death Foretold
 Convention on the Rights of the Child
 Corrective rape
 Crime of passion
 Crimes against humanity
 Domestic violence
 Extramarital sex
 Face (sociological concept), a classification of honor
 Femicide
 Filicide
 Fornication
 Gender apartheid
 Gendercide
 Guilt-shame-fear spectrum of cultures
 Hate crime
 Honor suicide
 Human rights
 Human sacrifice
 Infanticide
 Izzat (honour)
 Ka-Mer
 Kiri-sute gomen
 LGBT rights by country or territory
 Lynching
 Memini
 Namus
 Premarital sex
 Religious violence
 Sati (practice)
 Slut-shaming
 Universal Declaration of Human Rights
 Violence against LGBT people
 Violence against women
 Women's rights
 Youth rights

References

Further reading

  
 NDTV. Honour killing in Delhi 4 Sep 2012. 
 Burke, Jason. The Guardian. Triple murder in India highlights increase in 'honour killings' . 25 June 2010.
 Emery, James. Reputation is Everything: Honor Killing among the Palestinians . 2003.
 "Jordan Parliament Supports Impunity for Honor Killing", Washington, D.C.: Human Rights Watch news release, January 2000.
 Burned Alive: A Victim of the Law of Men. Alleged first-person account of Souad, a victim of an attempted honor killing. The authenticity of this work has been questioned, as it is based on a repressed memory report.

 Schulze, Kirsten, Martin Stokes and Colm Campbell (1996) (eds.), Nationalism, Minorities and Diasporas: Identities and Rights in the Middle East (London: I.B. Tauris)
 Tintori, Karen, 2007. Unto the Daughters: The Legacy of an Honor Killing in a Sicilian-American Family. St. Martin's Press.
 Wikan, Unni, 2002. Generous Betrayal: Politics of Culture in the New Europe. University of Chicago Press.
 Yavuz, Ercan. "Honor killings a misunderstood concept, study finds". Today's Zaman. 1 August 2010.
 Sanghera, Jasvinder, 2009. "Daughters of shame"
 Ermers Robert. 2018. "Honor Related Violence. A New Social Psychological Perspective", Routledge. Honor Related Violence: A New Social Psychological Perspective  
 Ercan, Selen A., 2014. 'Same Problem, Different Solutions: The Case of 'Honour Killing' in Germany and Britain', In: Gill, Aisha K., Carolyn Strange, and Karl Roberts, 'Honour' Killing and Violence. Theory, Policy and Practice, London: Palgrave Macmillan, pp. 199–218.
 Ercan, Selen A., 2014. Dangerous silence: Debating ' honor killings'. Open Democracy, 1 July 2014
 Robert Fisk The crimewave that shames the world  The Independent, 7 September 2010

 
Honor
Homicide
Domestic violence
Gender-related violence
Violence against women
Violence against LGBT people
Crimes against women
Killings by type